William Evans Garrett Gilmore (February 16, 1895 – December 5, 1969), sometimes known as Garrett Gilmore, was an American rower. He won a silver medal in the single sculls at the 1924 Summer Olympics and a gold in double sculls at the 1932 Games.

Gilmore served in the U.S. Army during World War I. He took up rowing in 1919 at the Bachelors Barge Club in  Philadelphia. Next year he won his first junior national title. He later collected five national senior titles in the single sculls and several more in the doubles. After retiring from competitions Gilmore worked as a real estate broker.

He died on December 5, 1969 and was interred at Laurel Hill Cemetery in Philadelphia.

References

External links
 

1895 births
1969 deaths
American male rowers
American real estate brokers
Burials at Laurel Hill Cemetery (Philadelphia)
Medalists at the 1924 Summer Olympics
Medalists at the 1932 Summer Olympics
Olympic gold medalists for the United States in rowing
Olympic silver medalists for the United States in rowing
Rowers at the 1924 Summer Olympics
Rowers at the 1932 Summer Olympics
Sportspeople from Delaware County, Pennsylvania
United States Army personnel of World War I